John Howard "Jack" Nelson (October 11, 1929 – October 21, 2009) was an American journalist. He was praised for his coverage of the Watergate scandal, in particular, and he was described by New York Times editor Gene Roberts as "one of the most effective reporters in the civil rights era."
He won a Pulitzer Prize in 1960.

Youth

Nelson was born in Talladega, Alabama. His father ran a fruit store during the Great Depression. Nelson moved with his family to Georgia and eventually to Biloxi, Mississippi, where he graduated from Notre Dame High School in 1947.

Early career
After graduating from high school Nelson began his journalism career with the Biloxi Daily Herald. There he earned the nickname 'Scoop' for his aggressive reporting. He then worked for the U.S. Army writing press releases before taking a job with the Atlanta Journal-Constitution in 1952. He won the Pulitzer for local reporting under deadline in 1960, citing "the excellent reporting in his series of articles on mental institutions in Georgia."

Los Angeles Times
 
Nelson joined the Los Angeles Times in 1965. He played an important role in uncovering the truth about the 1968 Orangeburg Massacre, where South Carolina Highway Patrol officers shot and killed African-American students protesting racial segregation in South Carolina. Nelson obtained the victims' medical records, which showed the police had shot some of the black students in the back of the head.

In 1970 he wrote a story about how the Federal Bureau of Investigation and local police in Meridian, Mississippi shot two Ku Klux Klan members in a sting bankrolled by the local Jewish community. One of the Klan members, a woman, died in the ambush. FBI Director J. Edgar Hoover tried to kill the story, which appeared on the Los Angeles Times front page, by smearing Nelson, falsely, as an alcoholic.

In the early 1970s, Nelson led the LA Times's award-winning coverage of the Watergate scandal, and then served as the paper's Washington Bureau Chief for 21 years, from 1975 to 1996. During that period, he was a frequent guest on television and radio news programs.

Death
Jack Nelson died of pancreatic cancer at his home in Bethesda, Maryland on October 21, 2009, ten days after his 80th birthday.

Notes

References

External links

"Pulitzer Prize-Winning Journalist Jack Nelson Dies at 80", Associated Press via Yahoo News (October 21, 2009)
 Jack Nelson, Scoop: The Evolution of a Southern Reporter (Jackson, MS: University Press of Mississippi, 2013) 
 
Stuart A. Rose Manuscript, Archives, and Rare Book Library, Emory University: Jack Nelson papers, 1940-2011

20th-century American journalists
American newspaper reporters and correspondents
American male journalists
Los Angeles Times people
Journalists from Georgia (U.S. state)
Journalists from Mississippi
Pulitzer Prize for Local Reporting winners
People from Bethesda, Maryland
People from Biloxi, Mississippi
Deaths from cancer in Maryland
Deaths from pancreatic cancer
1929 births
2009 deaths